The 2006 Winchester Council election took place on 4 May 2006 to elect members of Winchester District Council in Hampshire, England. One third of the council was up for election and the Conservative Party gained overall control of the council from no overall control.

After the election, the composition of the council was:
Conservative 29
Liberal Democrat 21
Independent 4
Labour 3

Campaign
Before the election the Liberal Democrats had 26 seats, the Conservatives 22, independents 5 and Labour 4. 19 seats were being contested with 4 Liberal Democrat and 1 independent councillors standing down at the election, while the council leader Sheila Campbell and 2 other cabinet members were defending seats.

Issues in the election included anti-social behaviour, council tax, rural transportation and planning policy.

Election result
The count was disrupted delaying the last result after some of the ballot papers were set on fire meaning water had to be poured into the ballot box. The results saw the Conservatives take control of the council for the first time since the early 1990s. They gained 7 seats included 5 from the Liberal Democrats and 1 each from Labour and the independents. Conservatives defeated both the Liberal Democrat council leader Sheila Campbell and the Labour leader Patrick Davies.

The widespread press coverage earlier in the year about the local Liberal Democrat MP Mark Oaten having had sex with male prostitutes was seen as having damaged the Liberal Democrats and benefited the Conservatives. In the July after the election Oaten announced that he would be standing down from parliament at the next general election.

Following the election George Beckett became the new Conservative leader of the council.

Ward results

Bishop's Waltham

Cheriton & Bishops Sutton

Colden Common and Twyford

Denmead

Droxford, Soberton and Hambledon

Kings Worthy

Olivers Battery & Badger Farm

Owslebury & Curdridge

Shedfield

Sparsholt

St. Barnabas

St. Bartholomew

St. John and All Saints

St. Luke

St. Michael

St. Paul

Swanmore and Newton

The Alresfords

Wonston and Micheldever

References

2006
2006 English local elections
2000s in Hampshire